Cristian Muñoz Reyes (born February 15, 1981, in Puerto Saavedra) is a male race walker from Chile.

Career
He twice competed for his native country at the Pan American Games (2003 and 2007). He set his personal best (1:24:26) in the men's 20 km race walk in Puerto Saavedra on September 14, 2002.

Achievements

References

External links

1981 births
Living people
Chilean male racewalkers
Athletes (track and field) at the 2003 Pan American Games
Athletes (track and field) at the 2007 Pan American Games
Pan American Games competitors for Chile
People from Puerto Saavedra
21st-century Chilean people
20th-century Chilean people